The Financial Services and Markets Act 2000 (c 8) is an Act of the Parliament of the United Kingdom that created the Financial Services Authority (FSA) as a regulator for insurance, investment business and banking, and the Financial Ombudsman Service to resolve disputes as a free alternative to the courts.

The Act was considerably amended by the Financial Services Act 2012 and the Bank of England and Financial Services Act 2016.

Contents
Some of the key sections of this act are:

Part I The Regulator
 Section 1A outlines the regulatory objectives of the Financial Conduct Authority: (a) market confidence; (b) financial stability (c) public awareness; (d) the protection of consumers; and (e) the reduction of financial crime.
 Section 2A establishes the Prudential Regulation Authority

Part II Regulated And Prohibited Activities
 Section 19 requires firms to be authorised to conduct regulated activities.
 Section 21 makes it a criminal offence to issue a financial promotion (an invitation to engage in investment activity) in the United Kingdom unless it is issued or approved by an authorised firm or exempt via the Financial Promotions Order.

Part III Authorisation and Exemption

Part IVA Permission to Carry on Regulated Activities

Part V Performance of Regulated Activities
 Section 59 states that a person cannot carry out certain controlling functions in a firm without approval by the FSA.

Part VI Official Listing
 Section 71 allows private persons to sue a firm for damages if a person performing a controlled function is not approved.

Part VII Control of Business Transfers

Part VIII Penalties for Market Abuse
 Section 118 concerns market abuse.

Part 8A Short selling

Part IX Hearings and Appeals
 Section 132 establishes the Financial Services and Markets Tribunal.

Part XI Information Gathering and Investigations
 Sections 165 and 165A give the FCA and PRA power to require certain information.

Part XII Control Over Authorised Persons

Part XIII Incoming Firms Intervention by Authority

Part XIV Disciplinary Measures

Part XV The Financial Services Compensation Scheme
 Section 213 establishes the Financial Services Compensation Scheme.

Part 15A Power to require FSCS manager to act in relation to other schemes

Part XVI The Ombudsman Scheme
 Section 225 establishes the Financial Ombudsman Service.

Part XVII Collective Investment Schemes

Part XVIII Recognised Investment Exchanges and Clearing Houses

Part 18A SUSPENSION AND REMOVAL OF FINANCIAL INSTRUMENTS FROM TRADING

Part XIX Lloyd’s

Part XX Provision of Financial Services by Members of the Professions

Part XXI Mutual Societies

Part XXII Auditors and Actuaries

Part XXIII Public Record, Disclosure of Information and Co-operation

Part XXIV Insolvency

Part XXV Injunctions and Restitution

Part XXVI Notices

Part XXVII Offences
 Section 397 makes it a criminal offence to mislead a market or investors.

Part XXVIII Miscellaneous

Part XXIX Interpretation

Part XXX Supplemental

See also

Financial Services Act 1986
UK company law
UK commercial law
UK banking law
European Union law
Part VII transfer

Notes

External links
.

United Kingdom Acts of Parliament 2000
Financial regulation in the United Kingdom
2000 in economics